The 2000 New Hampshire Wildcats football team was an American football team that represented the University of New Hampshire as a member of the Atlantic 10 Conference during the 2000 NCAA Division I-AA football season. In its second year under head coach Sean McDonnell, the team compiled a 6–5 record (4–4 against conference opponents) and finished in a tie for fourth place in the Atlantic 10 Conference.

Schedule

References

New Hampshire
New Hampshire Wildcats football seasons
New Hampshire Wildcats football